Na Ah Tee, historically also known as Na-Ah-Tee Canyon, Na-a-tih Trading Post, and Na-at-tee Canyon, is a populated place situated in Navajo County, Arizona, United States.

References

Populated places in Navajo County, Arizona